Chaos and Disorder is the eighteenth studio album by American recording artist Prince. It was released on July 9, 1996, by Warner Bros. Records. The album reached number 26 in the United States - his poorest performance with an album of new material since his debut - and number 14 in the United Kingdom.  Prince refused to promote the album, still engaged in his fight against his Warner Bros. contract, and it was released simply to fulfill his contractual obligations. The inlay sleeve carries the message:

The single "Dinner with Delores" was released in the United Kingdom only, and despite the low-key promotion, became a Top 40 hit, albeit a minor one by his previous standards. Despite having been out of print for years, the album was released digitally on Tidal in 2016, and on iTunes in 2018. It was reissued on CD and vinyl in September 2019. The inlay sleeve shows a bloody hypodermic needle with a dollar bill inside it, and a human heart sitting in a toilet bowl.

Production, release and re-appraisal
While Prince insisted that the album "was done very quickly", and that they were "seeing how fast and hard we could thrash it out", more than a third of it dates back to sessions for The Gold Experience and Come. It also marked the return of Rosie Gaines, who sang on five songs, and Michael B. and Sonny T., in what were to be their last sessions as regular New Power Generation members. A re-appraisal of the album after Prince's death lauded it as "a rocker with moments of some of Prince's finest guitar playing." Another described it as a "tightly-focused, grunge-oriented rock-funk collection" where "the grit and punch of the musicianship is what gives the album its overall raw edge". The Village Voice critic Robert Christgau wrote in his review that, "anybody expecting a kissoff or a throwaway radically underestimates his irrepressible musicality. Apropos of nothing, here's a guitar album for your earhole, enhanced by a fresh if not shocking array of voices and trick sounds and cluttered now and then by horns."
At the time of its release, Prince told the Los Angeles Times: "I was bitter before, but now I've washed my face. I can just move on. I'm free."

Warner Bros. contract

After Chaos and Disorder it was 18 years before Prince released another album on Warner Bros., 2014's Plectrumelectrum, under a deal which gave back Prince control of his masters, the absence of which on his original contract had been a source of considerable acrimony.

Track listing
All songs written by Prince.

Singles
 "Dinner with Delores" (#36 UK)

Charts

References

Further reading 
 

1996 albums
Prince (musician) albums
Albums produced by Prince (musician)
Warner Records albums